Lee Jun Gil (born September 18, 1985) is a South Korean cross-country skier who has competed since 2002. He finished 79th in the 15 km event at the 2010 Winter Olympics in Vancouver, British Columbia, Canada.

Lee finished 80th in the individual sprint event at the FIS Nordic World Ski Championships 2009 in Liberec.

His best World Cup finish was 81st in an individual sprint event at Finland in 2008.

References

1985 births
Cross-country skiers at the 2010 Winter Olympics
Living people
Olympic cross-country skiers of South Korea
South Korean male cross-country skiers
Cross-country skiers at the 2011 Asian Winter Games
Asian Games medalists in cross-country skiing
Asian Games bronze medalists for South Korea
Medalists at the 2011 Asian Winter Games